Littlemill  is a village located close to Nairn in Nairnshire, Scottish Highlands and is in the Scottish council area of Highland.

References

Populated places in the County of Nairn